Robert P. Epstein (born April 6, 1955), is an American director, producer, writer, and editor. He has won two Academy Awards for Best Documentary Feature, for the films The Times of Harvey Milk and Common Threads: Stories from the Quilt.

In 1987, Epstein and his filmmaking partner, Jeffrey Friedman, founded Telling Pictures, a production company and team known for "groundbreaking feature documentaries".

In addition to nonfiction documentaries, Epstein's works include scripted narratives such as Howl, his award-winning film about Allen Ginsberg's controversial poem by the same name (starring James Franco), and Lovelace, the story about the life and trials of pornographic superstar Linda Lovelace (starring Amanda Seyfried).

Epstein is currently the co-chair of the Film Program at California College of the Arts in San Francisco and Oakland, California.

He is openly gay.

Filmography

References

External links

1955 births
Living people
American film directors
American film producers
Directors of Best Documentary Feature Academy Award winners
Grammy Award winners
News & Documentary Emmy Award winners
LGBT people from New Jersey
LGBT film directors
People from New Brunswick, New Jersey